Mount Zion United Methodist Church is a historic black church located at 1334 29th Street NW in the Georgetown neighborhood of Washington, D.C., United States.

It was built in 1876 and added to the National Register of Historic Places in 1975.

See also
 Mount Zion Cemetery (Washington, D.C.)

References

External links

19th-century Methodist church buildings in the United States
African-American history of Washington, D.C.
Gothic Revival church buildings in Washington, D.C.
Churches on the National Register of Historic Places in Washington, D.C.
Churches completed in 1876
United Methodist churches in Washington, D.C.
1876 establishments in Washington, D.C.
Churches in Georgetown (Washington, D.C.)